The Forgotten Rebels are a punk rock band from Hamilton, Ontario, Canada.  Founded in 1977, the Forgotten Rebels have a discography of seven albums and a collection of EPs and singles.

History
In 1979, Chris Houston (a.k.a. Pogo Agogo) joined the band and played bass on the 1980 release In Love With the System.  Houston left the band just over a year later citing "creative differences" and time constraints as he pursued post secondary education.

Members 

Current 
Mickey DeSadist (Mike Grelecki) – vocals (1977–present)
Jeffrey Campbell – guitar (1989–present)
Shawn Maher – bass (2000–present)
Dan Casale – drums (2004–present)

Former 
Alan J. Smolak – guitar (1978-1980)
Mark Chewter – guitar (1980-1981)
Mike Mirabella – guitar (1981-1989)
Pete Timusk – bass (1977-1977)
Carl Johnson – bass (1977-1979)
Chris Houston – bass (1979-1980)
John Welton – bass (1981-1986)
Mike Szykowny – bass (1982-1989, 1991-1991)
Dave Kyle – bass (1989-1991)
Chaz Coats-Butcher – bass (1992-1997)
Steve Mahon – bass (1997-2001)
Angelo Maddalena – drums (1977-1978)
Robert Allen – drums (1978-1978, 1981-1981)
Pete Lotimer – drums (1978-1979)
Cleave Anderson – drums (1978-1979)
Larry Potvin – drums (1979-1980)
Chuck McDonald – drums (1980-1980)
Dave McGhire – drums (1981-2003)
Joe Csontos – drums (1983-1984)
Paul Newman – drums (2003-2004)

Timeline

Discography

Albums

In Love With the System (1980)
Produced by Bob "Cowboy" Bryden
Star Records
Track list:
Bomb the Boats and Feed the Fish
I Think of Her
In Love with the System
The Punks Are Allright
Rich and Bored
Time to Run
Fuck Me Dead
No Beatles Reunion
You're A Rebel Too
I Left My Heart In Iran
Elvis Is Dead
Bones In The Hallway

This Ain't Hollywood (1981)

Produced by Bob "Cowboy" Bryden
Star Records
Track list:
Hello Hello
Tell Me You Love Me
This Ain't Hollywood
Don't Hide Your Face
Memory Lane
Surfin' On Heroin
Rhona Barrett
The Me Generation
England Keep Yer Stars
Eve Of Destruction
Your Own Little World
Save the Last Dance For Me
It Won't Be Long

The Pride and Disgrace (1986)
Produced by Chris Spedding
OPM / EMI
Track list:
Ethiopia
Sadie
Graveyard Rock
Rain
Little Girl
Hiding In Your Room
I Am King
Bomb Russia
Matchstick Man
Live Strippers
Underwear
Surfin' On Heroin
Bonus track: Bomb Russia (Replay)

Surfin' on Heroin (1988)
Produced by Ken McNeil
Restless / Enigma / EMI records

Side One
Bomb the Boats
I'm in Love with the System
Let's Go Back
A.I.D.S.
I Left My Heart in Iran
Rock and Roll's a Hard Life

Side two
Little Girl Thrills
Live Strippers in Action
Hell Begins at Home
Elvis Is Dead
Surfin' on Heroin
FMD

(Untitled) (1989)
Produced by Stacy Heydon
Restless / Enigma / EMI records

Track list:
Behind Bars
Touch Me
Dizzy
Good Times (Never Last)
Tea & Crumpets
Wild-Eyed Darlin'
I Gotta Axe
The Girl Can't Come
Evelyn Dick
Don't Die Alone
Science Fiction Double Feature (Theme From The Rocky Horror Show)

Criminal Zero (1994)
Produced by Dave McGhire and Eric Ratz
Air America / EMI records
Track list:
Criminal Zero
The Hammer 3:36
Buried Alive 4:03
Asshole 3:42
Gangland 3:27
Autosuck 2:05
Karaoke Nite In Attica 3:00
Do It To You 2:13
Hard Knox 2:53
Prisoners 3:31
Next Big Thrill 3:08
Views 3:16
New Flag 3:07
Shit For Brains 3:01

Executive Outcomes (1997)
Bacchus Archives
Track list:
In Love With The System
You're A Rebel Too
The Punks Are Alright
Time To Run
They're Coming To Take Me Away (Live)
I Left My Heart In Iran (Live)
I Think Of Her (Live)
Fuck Me Dead (Live)
Bomb The Boats (And Feed The Fish) (Live)
Rich & Bored (Live)
Elvis Is Dead (Live)
Bones In The Hallway (Live)
Nazis (Live)
You're A Rebel, Too (Live)
Time To Run (Live)

Nobody's Heros (2000)
Produced by Dave McGhire and Eric Ratz
Opm/EMI records
Track list:
Hockeynite
The American In Me
No Place To Hide
Highschool Hookers
Dickwart
Zeros
New Look
Hey Little Girl
Fool Me Once
Crackin Me Up
Wasted
Baby Baby
Ready To Beat U
Shrink Dink

Brief Anthology (2000)
Self Released
Track list:
3rd Homosexual Murder
Angry
Bomb The Boats
I Think Of Her
Fuck Me Dead
Elvis Is Dead
Surfin On Heroin
The Me Generation
Don't Hide Your Face
Can't Wait
Little Girl In The Snow
Sadie Sadie
Rock N Roll Is A Hard Life
AIDS
Evelyn Dick
Criminal Zero
Autosuck
Hockey Nite
No Place To Hide
High School Hooker

Last Ones Standing (2011)
Recorded live at Lee's Palace, Toronto, Ontario, Canada February 2, 2008
Self Released
Track list:
Bomb The Boats And Feed The Fish
I Think Of Her
In Love With The System
Tell Me You Love Me
Angry
A.I.D.S.
Rich & Bored
Time To Run
Elvis Is Dead
England Keep Your Stars
Live Strippers In Action
She Said Oh
You're A Rebel Too
Hello Hello It's Me Again
Autosuck
Super Fan
Fuck Me Dead (FMD)
Surfin On Heroin

EPs

Burn The Flag (1978)
A six-song demo tape recorded and released in 1978.
You're a Rebel Too
In Love With The System
New Wave Girl
National Unity
Reich'n'Roll
Angry

Tomorrow Belongs to Us (1978)

National unity
3rd Homosexual Murder
Reich 'N Roll
Angry
Your a Rebel too
In love with the system
New wave girl
National unity (again)
Reich 'N roll (again)
Angry (again)
Surfin' on heroin
Own little world
This ain't Hollywood
Poppies
Bomb the boats
White trash of America
I think of her
Fuck me dead
Elvis is dead

Boys Will Be Boys (1985)
Can't Wait
Boys Will Be Boys
High School Nervous Breakdown
Reason To Dance

Singles
"Tell me You Love Me" / "Rhona Barrett" (Remix) (1982)
"Bomb Kadhaffi Now" / "Surfin' on Heroin" (1986)

Sex Pistols / Forgotten Rebels combo single
A side: Sex Pistols "God Save the Queen"
B side: Forgotten Rebels "Surfin' on Heroin"
Cover artwork by "Stabazy"

Videos
Elvis is Dead (1979)
Eve of Destruction (1980)
Boys Will be Boys (1985)
Rock n Roll is a Hard Life (1989)
Dizzy (1990)
The Hammer (1994)
Buried Alive (1994)
The American in Me (2002) Never released
No Place to Hide (2002) Never released

References

External links
Official Home Page
 

Musical groups from Hamilton, Ontario
Forgotten Rebels, The
Musical groups established in 1977
Musical quartets
1977 establishments in Ontario
Restless Records artists
Enigma Records artists